Eugnosta parapamirana is a species of moth of the family Tortricidae. It is found in Afghanistan.

References

Moths described in 2005
Eugnosta